The Liberation of St Peter from Prison (also called the Deliverance of Saint Peter) is a small tempera on wood panel or predella from a large polyptych or multipanel altarpiece painted in 1370-1371 by Jacopo di Cione for the no-longer extant church of San Pier Maggiore in Florence, Italy.
It is now part of the collection of the Philadelphia Museum of Art.

The polyptych was designed by Niccolaio and made in collaboration with Matteo di Pacino. This panel forms part of the narrative story of St Peter that included at least five other predella scenes:
Six predella panels of the altarpiece still exist, dispersed in different collections, namely:
The Arrest of St Peter at the Rhode Island School of Design Museum of Art, Providence
St Peter raising the Son of Theophilus at the Vatican Pinacoteca
Seating St Peter as Bishop of Antioch at the Vatican Pinacoteca
Last Meeting of Sts Peter and Paul formerly part of Thyssen-Bornemisza and Sacerdoti Collections
Crucifixion of St Peter at the Vatican Pinacoteca

The superior portions of the altarpiece are now in the National Gallery, London.

The scene depicts the Liberation of Peter, an event from  that says that Peter was put into prison in Jerusalem by King Herod, but the night before his trial an angel awoke while he lay between two guards and a light shone in the cell. Both the angel and Peter have saintly haloes; the angel has golden hair. The soldiers wear semi-conical caps. Under the angel's escort, Peter's chains fell off and the city gates opened. The scene shows the angel awakening St Peter inside the cell, and on the right, leading him by the hand past sleeping guards. Peter was initially incredulous, thinking that it was a dream. He exits the dark cell into a gilded world of freedom.

References

1370s paintings
Gothic paintings
Italian paintings
Paintings in the collection of the Philadelphia Museum of Art
Paintings depicting Saint Peter
Collection of the Rhode Island School of Design Museum